Kéké is a village and seat of the commune of Niansanarié in the Cercle of Djenné in the Mopti Region of southern-central Mali.

Populated places in Mopti Region